The 2016 Men's Ford National Hockey League was the 18th edition of the men's field hockey tournament. The competition was held in various cities across New Zealand, from 27 August to 17 September.

Midlands won the title for the second time, defeating Canterbury 3–1 in the final. Central finished in third place defeating North Harbour 3–2 in penalties following a 3–3 draw.

Participating Teams
The following eight teams competed for the title:

 Auckland
 Canterbury
 Capital
 Central
 Midlands
 Northland
 North Harbour

Results
All times are local (NZST).

Preliminary round

Fixtures

Classification round

Fifth and sixth place

Third and fourth place

Final

Statistics

Final standings

Goalscorers

References

External links
Official website

Hockey
New Zealand National Hockey League seasons